is a Japanese type of noodle-based salad that is served cold. It is a dish based on its main ingredient, the sōmen noodle. Essentially, the salad consists of three main parts: the noodles, the vinegar-based sauce, and the garnish. Some recipes include chicken broth, lemon juice, or sesame oil for mixing in the broth. The variety of garnish ranges from shredded lettuce, scallions, sesame seeds, slivered char siu or ham to scrambled eggs.

Salads
Japanese noodle dishes
Noodle salads